Kevin Young Jr. (born June 24, 1990) is a Puerto Rican professional basketball player for the Osos de Manatí of the Baloncesto Superior Nacional (BSN). He played college basketball for Loyola Marymount and Kansas.

High school career
Young attended Perris High School of the Sun Belt League. He helped his team go 25-7 overall and 10-0 in league play and leading his team to the CIF-SS Division 3 finals where it lost to Hemet West Valley. He finished his senior season averaging 16.1 points, 10.8 rebounds and 3.7 blocks.

College career
Young began his college basketball career with Loyola Marymount where he broke the LMU school freshman rebounds (224) and rebounds per game (7.2 rpg) records with 224 boards for 7.2 rpg and also set the LMU freshman records with 34 blocked shots and 51 steals.

In 2011, Young transferred to Kansas. As a junior, he played in 38 of 39 games, becoming the Jayhawks’ key sixth man as the season progressed. He averaged 11.4 minutes, 3.4 points, 3.0 rebounds and 0.6 assists per game. As a senior, he ranked among the Big 12 leaders in rebounding (seventh, 6.8) and steals (15th, 1.1) and was Kansas’ second-leading rebounder at 6.8 rpg. Young had 22 games with seven or more rebounds, including each of his final four games of the season.

Professional career
After going undrafted in the 2013 NBA draft, Young signed with Mexican club Halcones de Xalapa on October 29, 2013. He later had a stint in Puerto Rico playing for Brujos de Guayama before signing with the Halifax Rainmen in December 2014. Young was named NBL Canada Defensive Player of the Year for the 2014–15 season. On May 1, 2015, he and 10 Rainmen teammates were fined $5,000 each and suspended from the NBL for an indefinite amount of time. The team did not appear in the decisive contest of the league finals after violence broke out in the shootaround prior to the game. He subsequently returned to Brujos de Guayama.

On October 31, 2015, Young was selected by the Bakersfield Jam with the 17th overall pick in the 2015 NBA Development League Draft, only to be traded to the Maine Red Claws in a three-team draft night deal. On January 17, 2016, he was waived by the Red Claws.

He joined the Stockton Kings in 2019. In his debut, Young posted 17 points and grabbed 12 rebounds in a victory over the Canton Charge. In 2021, Young signed with the Enid Outlaws of The Basketball League.

In June 2021, Young signed with Mets de Guaynabo of the Baloncesto Superior Nacional.

International career
He also represents Puerto Rico at the international level, having played for his home country in the 2009 FIBA Under-19 World Championship and placing sixth overall.

Personal life
He is the son of Alicia Morales and Kevin Young, Sr and has a brother and a sister. His father played basketball at Mt. San Jancinto College. Young graduated from Kansas with a degree in African American Studies and a minor in history.

References

External links 
 Loyola Marymount Lions bio
 Kansas Jayhawks bio

1990 births
Living people
American expatriate basketball people in Canada
American expatriate basketball people in Mexico
American people of Puerto Rican descent
Basketball players at the 2015 Pan American Games
Basketball players from Riverside, California
Central American and Caribbean Games bronze medalists for Puerto Rico
Competitors at the 2014 Central American and Caribbean Games
Halcones de Xalapa players
Halifax Rainmen players
Kansas City Tornadoes players
Kansas Jayhawks men's basketball players
Loyola Marymount Lions men's basketball players
Maine Red Claws players
Pan American Games competitors for Puerto Rico
People from Perris, California
Santa Cruz Warriors players
Small forwards
Stockton Kings players
Central American and Caribbean Games medalists in basketball